Acanthodactylus gongrorhynchatus, also known commonly as the Saudi fringe-fingered lizard, is a species of lizard in the family Lacertidae. The species is endemic to the Arabian Peninsula.

Geographic range
A. gongrorhynchatus is found in Saudi Arabia and the United Arab Emirates.

Reproduction
A. gongrorhynchatus is oviparous.

References

Further reading
Leviton, Alan E.; Anderson, Steven C. (1967). "Survey of the reptiles of the Sheikhdom of Abu Dhabi, Arabian Peninsula. Part II. Systematic account of the collection of reptiles made in the Sheikhdom of Abu Dhabi by John Gasperetti". Proceedings of the California Academy of Sciences, Fourth Series 35: 157–192. (Acanthodactylus gongrorhynchatus, new species, pp. 171–177, Figures 9A, 10A).
Leviton, Alan E.; Anderson, Steven C.; Adler, Kraig; Minton, Sherman A. (1992). Handbook to Middle East Amphibians and Reptiles. (Contributions to Herpetology No. 8). Oxford, Ohio: Society for the Study of Amphibians and Reptiles (SSAR). 252 pp. .
Salvador, Alfredo (1982). "A revision of the lizards of the genus Acanthodactylus (Sauria: Lacertidae)". Bonner Zoologische Monographien (16): 1–167. (Acanthodactylus gongrorhynchatus, pp. 136–139, Figures 89–91, Map 27). (in English, with an abstract in German).

Acanthodactylus
Reptiles described in 1967
Taxa named by Alan E. Leviton
Taxa named by Steven C. Anderson